Miroslav Stoch (born 19 October 1989) is a Slovak professional footballer, who currently plays as a winger for Motorlet Prague and competed for the Slovakia national team.

He has earned 60 caps for Slovakia since his debut in 2009, and was included in their squad for the 2010 FIFA World Cup and UEFA Euro 2016.

On 7 January 2013, he won the FIFA Puskás Award for the best goal of 2012, ahead of Neymar and Radamel Falcao.

Club career

Early career and Chelsea

Stoch's father realized his talent at an early age and placed him with his local club's academy Nitra. His hard work paid off as he was drafted into Nitra's first team after scoring a hat-trick in an under-17 match, at only 15 years old. Due to age restrictions in the Slovak First League, he could not play until his 16th birthday. He made his first-team debut at the age of 16 and by this time he was already being watched by European scouts.

Chelsea had scouts in one of the international competitions he played in and offered him a trial around the same time that Nice was about to sign him. He duly impressed and was signed by Chelsea's youth academy in 2006. He was a regular for the under-18s in the 2006–07 season and scored 11 goals. He ended the season as top scorer for the under-18s even though he had always played on the wing. He started the 2007–08 season well and quickly progressed to the reserve team.

Stoch himself stated that he was close to making his first-team debut and hoped to do so during the course of the 2007–08 season although he did not. Stoch finally made his first appearance as a substitute on 30 November 2008 against Arsenal at Stamford Bridge. He replaced Deco after 80 minutes. Chelsea lost the game 1–2. Stoch made his second appearance for the first-team, replacing Mikel John Obi in the 82nd minute, in Chelsea's 2–1 comeback win over Stoke City, playing a major part in the lead-up to Chelsea's second goal. Stoch again came on for Mikel against Watford in the FA Cup fifth round with Chelsea 1–0 down with 20 minutes. The game finished 3–1 to Chelsea.

Twente
On 16 July 2009, Twente signed Stoch on loan from Chelsea. Stoch made his first Eredivisie appearance against Sparta Rotterdam. He scored both goals in the 2–0 win over Heerenveen on 20 September 2009. Stoch then scored an impressive opening goal from long-distance, in the 4–0 win against Groningen on 25 October 2009. Stoch continued his impressive scoring record for Twente by scoring and getting an assist in the 2–1 win over Roda on 31 October 2009. 
In De Grolsch Veste league game against NAC Breda, which Twente won 3–1, Stoch scored two goals to propel the team to victory, after Twente fell behind by a goal. On 2 May 2010, he made the winning goal against NAC Breda, Twente won the match 2–0 in an away game which made Twente the champion of the Eredivisie for the first time. Stoch ended the season with 10 league goals (12 in all competitions), having started almost every competitive match for Twente.

Fenerbahçe

Stoch joined Turkish team Fenerbahçe on 11 June 2010 on a four-year deal for a fee of €5.5 million. On 28 July 2010, he scored his debut goal for the club in a Champions League match against Young Boys in Third qualifying round and Fenerbahçe draw the match with score 2–2 at Stade de Suisse on Bern. Fenerbahçe won the Süper Lig title in 2010–11, for a record 18th time, with Stoch contributing two goals. Fenerbahçe gave Stoch a two-year contract extension in 2012. Stoch is contracted to the club until 2015–16, making €1.75 million and €15000 per match in 2012–13. He would earn €1.75 million in addition to €16000 per game in 2013–14, €1.8 million plus €16000 per match in 2014–15 and €1.9 million as well as €17000 per game in 2015–16. In 2013, he won goal of the year 2012 against Gençlerbirliği on Süper Lig in the FIFA Puskás Award defeating Falcao and Neymar.

PAOK
In August 2013 Stoch joined PAOK after Fenerbahçe and PAOK came to an agreement for a one-year loan for €1 million. 
He scored his first goal with the club in the first leg of the UEFA Champions League Play-off qualifying round against FC Schalke 04. The match ended 1–1.

Al Ain
On 3 July 2014, he signed new contract with Fenerbahçe until 2018 and then joined Al Ain on a one-year loan deal for €1 million.

Bursaspor
On 22 August 2015, Stoch joined Bursaspor after Fenerbahçe and Bursaspor came to an agreement for a one-year loan.
In summer 2016, he returned to Fenerbahçe.

Slavia Prague
On 11 August 2017, Stoch joined Czech club Slavia Prague. He refused offers from Spain, France, Russia and wealthy clubs in the Near East. The main reason for this choice was Slavia's big chance of qualification into 2017–18 group stage of UEFA Champions League via upcoming play-off round against APOEL. Stoch  played in both play-off matches but could not help his new club to qualify to group stage. After the 0–2 loss in Cyprus and 0–0 draw at home, in which Stoch was subbed off after half-time because of injury, Slavia was eliminated from the Champions League and entered 2017–18 UEFA Europa League group stage. On 20 September 2017 after the 5–1 victory against Třinec in MOL Cup Stoch shouted, with Slavia fans, "Smrt Spartě" ("Death to Sparta") and was called before the Czech Football League's Disciplinary Commission.

He scored a goal as Slavia Prague won the 2017–18 Czech Cup final 3–1 against FK Jablonec on 9 May 2018.

On 21 November 2018, Stoch signed a new three-year contract with Slavia, keeping him at the club until June 2022. On 28 June 2019, Stoch was given permission by Slavia to fly to Greece to discuss a potential move to PAOK. The following day, Slavia confirmed that Stoch had moved to PAOK.

Return to PAOK
On 29 June 2019, PAOK officially announced the signing of Stoch on a three year contract for a transfer fee estimated in the region of €1.5 million with an annual fee of €750,000 (plus bonuses).

On 3 August 2020, Stoch announced that he had tested positive for COVID-19, a day after PAOK had announced that a member of the first-team had been infected. Two weeks later, the club announced that Stoch's contract was terminated by mutual consent.

Zagłębie Lubin
On 1 February 2021 he joined Zagłębie Lubin. He was released at the end of his contract in June 2021.

Slovan Liberec
On 22 September 2021 he joined FC Slovan Liberec.

Motorlet Prague
On 17 September 2022 Stoch made his debut for Motorlet Prague in a 3–1 home win against Sokol Hostouň.

International career

Stoch made his senior début for Slovakia on 10 February 2009 against Ukraine, where he came on in the 70th minute. His second appearance came just 24 hours later against Cyprus. He scored his first international goal for Slovakia against San Marino in a 2010 World Cup qualifier on 6 June 2009. Stoch was selected for the 2010 FIFA World Cup squad. On 7 September 2010, he scored the only goal of a Euro 2012 qualifying victory against Russia in Moscow. On 9 October 2014, Stoch scored the game-winning goal in the 2–1 UEFA Euro 2016 qualification win against title-holders Spain three minutes from time. Stoch became a part of a preliminary EURO 2016 squad and capped in a match against Germany, only days after death of his mother, due to which he had to be excused from a training camp in Austria in the previous week.

During the final tournament Stoch has only appeared against Wales, where he came on in the 83rd minute. During the flight from France Stoch had a conflict with national team coach Ján Kozák. In August 2016, Kozák said that he can not imagine his continuation of cooperation with Stoch and he has not been nominated until Kozák's resignation in October 2018.

Stoch made his national team return in November 2018, when he was called up by its new coach Pavel Hapal for Nations League matches against Ukraine and Czech Republic.

Style of play
Stoch bases his game on his two footballing idols Ronaldinho and Ronaldo and tries to emulate them on the pitch.

Career statistics

Club

International

Scores and results list Slovakia's goal tally first, score column indicates score after each Stoch goal.

Honours

Twente
 Eredivisie: 2009–10

Fenerbahçe
 Süper Lig: 2010–11
 Turkish Cup: 2011–12, 2012–13

Al Ain
 UAE Pro-League: 2014–15

Slavia Prague
 Czech First League: 2018–19
 Czech Cup: 2017–18, 2018–19

Individual
 FIFA Puskás Award: 2012
 Peter Dubovský Award: 2009, 2010

References

External links

 
 Miroslav Stoch at paokfc.gr
 
 
 Miroslav Stoch at Fenerbahçe.org
 

1989 births
Living people
Sportspeople from Nitra
Association football midfielders
Slovak footballers
Slovak expatriate footballers
Slovakia international footballers
Expatriate footballers in England
Expatriate footballers in the Netherlands
Expatriate footballers in Turkey
Expatriate footballers in Greece
Slovak expatriate sportspeople in the Netherlands
FC Nitra players
Chelsea F.C. players
Slovak expatriate sportspeople in England
Premier League players
Slovak expatriate sportspeople in Turkey
FC Twente players
Fenerbahçe S.K. footballers
PAOK FC players
Zagłębie Lubin players
Bursaspor footballers
Eredivisie players
Slovak Super Liga players
Süper Lig players
Ekstraklasa players
Super League Greece players
2010 FIFA World Cup players
Slovak expatriate sportspeople in Greece
Expatriate footballers in the United Arab Emirates
Slovak expatriate sportspeople in the United Arab Emirates
UAE Pro League players
Al Ain FC players
UEFA Euro 2016 players
Expatriate footballers in the Czech Republic
SK Slavia Prague players
FC Slovan Liberec players
Czech First League players
Slovak expatriate sportspeople in the Czech Republic
Slovak expatriate sportspeople in Poland
Expatriate footballers in Poland
Bohemian Football League players